The list of shipwrecks in 1936 includes ships sunk, foundered, grounded, or otherwise lost during 1936.

January

2 January

3 January

4 January

5 January

6 January

8 January

9 January

12 January

14 January

15 January

16 January

17 January

18 January

20 January

22 January

23 January

24 January

26 January

27 January

28 January

29 January

30 January

31 January

Unknown date

February

1 February

3 February

5 February

11 February

12 February

13 February

15 February

16 February

17 February

18 February

19 February

22 February

25 February

27 February

28 February

29 February

March

2 March

3 March

6 March

7 March

9 March

10 March

11 March

13 March

14 March

15 March

17 March

18 March

19 March

21 March

26 March

27 March

28 March

29 March

31 March

April

3 April

5 April

7 April

14 April

15 April

16 April

17 April

20 April

22 April

23 April

25 April

29 April

30 April

May

1 May

4 May

5 May

6 May

7 May

8 May

11 May

12 May

13 May

14 May

15 May

16 May

19 May

21 May

28 May

29 May

31 May

June

6 June

9 June

11 June

12 June

14 June

18 June

19 June

21 June

22 June

24 June

25 June

28 June

29 June

July

2 July

4 July

5 July

6 July

7 July

8 July

9 July

12 July

13 July

14 July

15 July

18 July

19 July

20 July

22 July

23 July

24 July

25 July

27 July

28 July

30 July

August

3 August

4 August

5 August

6 August

7 August

9 August

12 August

13 August

14 August

15 August

17 August

19 August

21 August

22 August

24 August

26 August

27 August

30 August

September

1 September

2 September

3 September

4 September

6 September

8 September

9 September

11 September

13 September

14 September

16 September

17 September

19 September

21 September

22 September

23 September

24 September

25 September

29 September

Unknown date

October

2 October

4 October

5 October

7 October

8 October

9 October

11 October

12 October

14 October

15 October

17 October

18 October

19 October

20 October

22 October

24 October

25 October

26 October

27 October

28 October

29 October

30 October

Unknown

November

1 November

2 November

3 November

8 November

9 November

10 November

11 November

12 November

13 November

14 November

15 November

17 November

18 November

20 November

21 November

22 November

23 November

24 November

25 November

27 November

30 November

Unknown date

December

2 December

3 December

6 December

7 December

8 December

9 December

12 December

14 December

16 December

18 December

19 December

23 December

24 December

26 December

27 December

28 December

30 December

Unknown date

References

1936
Shipwrecks